The red-throated twinspot  (Hypargos niveoguttatus) or Peters's twinspot is a common species of bird found in sub-saharan Africa.  This species has a large range, with an estimated global extent of occurrence of 2,000,000 km2.

It is commonly seen in Angola, Burundi, The Democratic Republic of the Congo, Kenya, Malawi, Mozambique, Namibia, Rwanda, Somalia, South Africa, Tanzania, Zambia & Zimbabwe. The status of the species is evaluated as Least Concern.

Origin
Origin and phylogeny has been obtained by Antonio Arnaiz-Villena et al. Estrildinae may have originated in India and dispersed thereafter (towards Africa and Pacific Ocean habitats).

References

BirdLife Species Factsheet
http://www.phthiraptera.org/Birds/Passeriformes/Estrildidae.html

External links
Image at ADW

 Redthroated Twinspot - Species text in The Atlas of Southern African Birds.

red-throated twinspot
Birds of East Africa
red-throated twinspot
red-throated twinspot